Giovanni da Pian del Carpine, variously rendered in English as John of Pian de Carpine, John of Plano Carpini or Joannes de Plano (c. 11851 August 1252), was a medieval Italian diplomat, archbishop and explorer and one of the first Europeans to enter the court of the Great Khan of the Mongol Empire. He is the author of the earliest important Western account of northern and Central Asia, Rus, and other regions of the Mongol dominion. He was the Primate of Serbia, based in Antivari, from 1247 to 1252.

Life before the journey
Giovanni appears to have been a native of Umbria, in central Italy. His surname was derived from Pian del Carpine (literally "Hornbeam Plain"), an area known later as Magione, between Perugia and Cortona. He was one of the companions and disciples of his near-contemporary and countryman Saint Francis of Assisi.

Highly esteemed within the Franciscan order, Giovanni had a prominent role in the propagation of its teachings in northern Europe, holding in succession the offices of warden (custos) in Saxony and provincial (minister) of Germany. He may also have held positions in Barbary and Cologne, and been provincial of Spain.

Background to his travels
Giovanni was a provincial of Germany at the time of the great Mongol invasion of eastern Europe and the Battle of Legnica (modern Legnickie Pole) on 9 April 1241. The defeat of European forces at Legnica almost led to Ögedei, Khan of the Mongol Empire, controlling most of Eastern Europe.

In Europe, dread of the "Tatars" (Mongols) was still widespread four years later, when Pope Innocent IV decided to dispatch the first formal Catholic mission to the Mongols. The missionaries were sent partly in protest at the Mongol invasion of Christendom and partly to gain information regarding the Khan's intentions and military strength.

Giovanni's travels
Pope Innocent IV chose Giovanni to head this mission, and apparently was in charge of nearly everything in the mission. As a papal legate, he bore a letter from the Pope to the Great Khan, Cum non solum. "At the age of sixty-three Carpini embarked from Lyon," where the Pope then resided, on Easter day (16 April 1245), accompanied by another friar, Stephen of Bohemia, who broke down at Kaniv near Kyiv and was left behind. After seeking counsel of an old friend, Wenceslaus, king of Bohemia, Giovanni was joined at Wrocław by another Franciscan, Benedykt Polak, appointed to act as interpreter.

The route passed by Kyiv, entered the Tatar posts at Kaniv, and then ran across the Nepere to the Don and Volga. Giovanni is the first Westerner to give us the modern names for these rivers. On the Volga stood the Ordu, or camp, of Batu, the famous conqueror of eastern Europe and supreme Mongol commander on the western frontiers of the empire. He was one of the most senior princes of the house of Genghis Khan. Here the envoys, with their presents, had to pass between two fires to remove possible injurious thoughts and poisons, before being presented to the prince (beginning of April 1246).

Batu ordered them to proceed to the court of the supreme Khan in Mongolia. On Easter day once more (8 April 1246), they started on the second and most formidable part of their journey. They were "so ill", writes the legate, "that we could scarcely sit a horse; and throughout all that Lent our food had been nought but millet with salt and water, and with only snow melted in a kettle for drink". Their bodies were tightly bandaged so they could endure the excessive fatigue of this enormous ride, which took them across the Jaec or Ural River, and north of the Caspian Sea and the Aral to the Jaxartes or Syr Darya (quidam fluvius magnus cujus nomen ignoramus, "a big river whose name we do not know"), and the Muslim cities that then stood on its banks. Then they went along the shores of the Dzungarian lakes until, on the feast of St Mary Magdalene (22 July), they reached the imperial camp called Sira Orda (i.e., Yellow Pavilion), near Karakorum and the Orkhon River. Giovanni and his companions rode an estimated 3000 miles in 106 days.

Since the death of Ögedei Khan, the imperial authority was in interregnum and Güyük, Ögedei's eldest son, was designated to the throne. His formal election in a great Kurultai, or diet of the tribes, took place while the friars were at Sira Orda, which entailed the gathering of 3000 to 4000 envoys and deputies from all parts of Asia and eastern Europe, bearing homage, tribute and presents. On 24 August they witnessed the formal enthronement at another camp in the vicinity called the Golden Ordu, after which they were presented to the new emperor.

The great Khan, Güyük, refused the invitation to become Christian, and demanded rather that the Pope and rulers of Europe should come to him and swear allegiance to him. The Khan did not dismiss the expedition until November. He gave them a letter to the Pope—written in Mongol, Arabic, and Latin—that was a brief imperious assertion of the Khan's office as the scourge of God. They began a long winter journey home. Often they had to lie on the bare snow, or on ground scraped bare of snow with a foot. They reached Kiev on 10 June 1247. There, and on their further journey, the Slavonic Christians welcomed them as risen from the dead, with festive hospitality. Crossing the Rhine at Cologne, they found the Pope still at Lyon, and delivered their report and the Khan's letter.

Not long afterward, Giovanni was rewarded with the archbishopric of Primate of Serbia in Antivari in Dalmatia, and was sent as legate to Louis IX of France. He lived only five years following the hardships of his journey. He died, according to the Franciscan Martyrology and other authorities, on 1 August 1252.

His books 

The Ystoria Mongalorum is the report compiled by Carpine, of his trip to the Mongol Empire. Written in the 1240s, it is the oldest European account of the Mongols. Carpine was the first European to try to chronicle Mongol history. Two versions of the Ystoria Mongalorum are known to exist: Carpine's own and another, usually referred to as the Tartar Relation.

Erik Hildinger translated Giovanni's book into English.

See also
Exploration of Asia
Dzungarian Gate

References

Further reading

External links

, handed by Giovanni da Pian del Carpine

1180s births
1252 deaths
13th-century explorers
13th-century Roman Catholic archbishops in Serbia
Archbishops of Antivari
Diplomats of the Holy See
Explorers of Asia
Italian explorers
Italian Friars Minor
Roman Catholic missionaries in Mongolia
Roman Catholic missionaries in Tibet
Year of birth uncertain
13th-century Italian writers
13th-century Latin writers